Trigonopterus mesehensis is a species of flightless weevil in the genus Trigonopterus from Indonesia.

Etymology
The specific name is derived from that of the type locality.

Description
Individuals measure 2.11–2.88 mm in length.  Body is slightly oval in shape.  General coloration is black, with rust-colored antennae and dark rust-colored legs.

Range

Phylogeny
T. mesehensis is part of the T. saltator species group.

References

mesehensis
Beetles described in 2014
Beetles of Asia
Insects of Indonesia